Enrico Tarenghi (14 April 1848 – 3 April 1938) was an Italian painter, mainly of genre and orientalist paintings. He preferred to work in watercolors.

Life and work
He was born and resident in Rome. He studied in the Academy of St Luke in Rome in the early 1860s. He maintained a joint studio with Nazzareno Cipriani and Giuseppe Aureli on the Via Margutta.

Tarenghi and Filippo Bartolini (1861-1908) were members of the so-called "Gruppo Simoni". They  may have traveled to Algeria with Gustavo Simoni in the early 1890s.

He specialised in watercolor and orientalist scenes. He was influenced by the style of the painter, Escordi.<ref>Abbiati, G., Malia d'Oriente, Lampi di stampa, 2018, p.76</ref> Like many other members of the Italian school of Orientalist art, he made extensive use of photography in his work. For example, he used a photograph as the template for the background in his painting of a pottery shop.

His paintings The Return from Work and Prayer by Muslims were first exhibited in Turin, in 1880, the latter also in Milan the next year. In Rome, in 1883, he had two canvases: Abbey of San Gregorio in Venice and Fulvia. In 1884 in Turin, he displayed an oil: Gelosia, and a watercolor: The Mother. In Livorno 1886, he exhibited Meditazione. Among his other works are: The convalescent woman;  (from Faust, Act one, first scene); and the  Temple of Antonio and Faustina, exhibited at Venice, in 1887.

Select list of paintings

 At the Shrine 
 Carpet sellers The Carpet Seller by the Nile 
 Prayer by Muslims 1880
 Conversation by the Fire. 1881 
 Praying Muslim, 1882
 Abbey of San Gregorio in Venice and Fulvia 1883
 Evening Prayer Leaving Prayers ''''Worshippers in a Mosque 
 Girl with Tambourine on the Arch of Titus, Roman Forum

References

External links
 More works by Tarenghi @ ArtNet

1848 births
1938 deaths
19th-century Italian painters
20th-century Italian painters
Italian male painters
Italian genre painters
Orientalist painters
Painters from Rome
19th-century Italian male artists
20th-century Italian male artists